Michael Collins (15 September 1879 – 23 February 1959) was an Irish athlete. He competed in the men's discus throw at the 1908 Summer Olympics.

References

1879 births
1959 deaths
Athletes (track and field) at the 1908 Summer Olympics
Irish male discus throwers
Olympic athletes of Great Britain
Place of birth missing